Three Coins in the Fountain is a 1954 American romantic comedy-drama film directed by Jean Negulesco from a screenplay by John Patrick, based on the 1952 novel Coins in the Fountain by John H. Secondari. It stars Clifton Webb, Dorothy McGuire, Jean Peters, Louis Jourdan, and Maggie McNamara, with Rossano Brazzi, Howard St. John, Kathryn Givney, and Cathleen Nesbitt. The film follows three American women working in Rome who dream of finding romance in the Eternal City. It was originally titled We Believe in Love.

The film's main title song "Three Coins in the Fountain", sung by an uncredited Frank Sinatra, went on to become an enduring standard. The film was made in Italy during the "Hollywood on the Tiber" era.

At the 27th Academy Awards in 1955, the film received two Academy Awards—for Best Cinematography and Best Song—and was nominated for Best Picture.

Plot

Young American secretary Maria Williams arrives in Rome and is greeted by Anita Hutchins, the woman whom she is replacing at the United States Distribution Agency. They drive to the Villa Eden, which Anita shares with Miss Frances, the longtime secretary of the American author John Frederick Shadwell, an expatriate living in Rome. On their way into town, the three women stop at the famous Trevi Fountain. Frances and Anita tell Maria that according to legend, if she throws a coin in the fountain and makes a wish to return to Rome, she will. Maria and Frances throw in their coins, but Anita, who is planning to return to the United States to marry, declines.

Anita takes Maria to the agency and introduces her to Giorgio Bianchi, a translator with whom she works. Maria senses that Anita and Giorgio are attracted to each other, though Anita states that the agency forbids its American and Italian employees to fraternize. Later that evening at a party, Maria is attracted by the handsome Prince Dino di Cessi, despite being warned by Frances and Anita about his being a notorious womanizer. His girlfriends become known as "Venice girls" after he takes them to Venice for romantic trysts. Dino charms Maria, telling her to ignore what she's heard about him.

After the party, Anita and Maria walk home and Anita admits that she has no fiancé waiting back in the United States. She's leaving because she believes she has a better chance of finding a husband in America; wealthy Italian men are not interested in mere secretaries, and the men who are interested are too poor. As they walk, Maria is pinched by a man who pesters her until she is rescued by Giorgio, who then asks Anita to go with him the next day to his family's country farm to attend a celebration. Anita reluctantly agrees.

The next morning, Giorgio picks Anita up in his cousin's dilapidated truck. On their way out of town, they are spotted by her boss, Burgoyne. On Giorgio's family farm, Giorgio tells Anita that he hopes to become a lawyer, despite his poverty. Anita then climbs into the truck and is almost killed when it rolls down the hill. After Giorgio rescues her, the breathless couple give in to their attraction and they kiss. Meanwhile, back at the apartment, Dino calls for Maria and asks if she will accompany him to Venice. Desiring to see Venice but not wanting to lose Dino's respect, Maria arranges for Frances to chaperone them — to Dino's disappointment.

At the agency on Monday, Burgoyne questions Maria about Anita's weekend with Giorgio and although she maintains that Anita did nothing wrong, Burgoyne assumes Anita is having an affair with Giorgio. The following day, he fires Giorgio. When Anita learns about this, she blames Maria for betraying her confidence and insists on moving out of their apartment. She visits Giorgio, worried that she might have ruined his chances of becoming a lawyer. Giorgio has no regrets.

Meanwhile, Maria sets out to attract Dino's affections. She learns about the modern art he loves, his favorite food and wine, and pretends to learn the piccolo (his favorite instrument). Maria even lies about her background, telling Dino she is three-quarters Italian. Beguiled by how much he apparently has in common with Maria, Dino introduces her to his mother, the Principessa, who expresses her approval. Later, Dino confides in Maria that she is the only girl whom he has ever completely trusted. Troubled by her deception, Maria confesses her subterfuge, even showing Dino her notebook listing his interests. He angrily takes her home.

Frances meets Anita, who admits that she and Giorgio are in love but will not marry because he is too poor. Frances returns home to comfort the guilt-stricken Maria, who is also determined to leave Rome because Dino has not contacted her since her admission. Frances tells her she is glad she is no longer young and susceptible to romance. The next morning, however, Frances suddenly announces to Shadwell that she is returning to the United States, explaining that she does not want to end up as an old maid in a foreign country. Shadwell, unaware that Frances has been deeply in love with him for fifteen years, offers her a marriage of convenience based on mutual respect. Eager to be with him under any circumstances, Frances accepts.

The next day, Shadwell learns that he is terminally ill and has less than a year to live unless he goes to America for experimental treatment. Shadwell returns to his villa and coldly breaks off his engagement to Frances. After Shadwell leaves, Frances learns from his doctor the truth about Shadwell's condition, and then follows him to a café, where she proceeds to match him drink for drink while bickering about whether he should pursue treatment. Completely drunk, Frances climbs into a nearby fountain and sobs about her life. After Shadwell takes her back to the villa and tucks her in, he goes to see Dino at the di Cessi palace. Shadwell tells Dino he is leaving for the United States where he will marry Frances. He uses reverse psychology to provoke Dino into realizing that he loves Maria.

After Anita and Maria are packed and ready to leave, Frances telephones and asks to meet them at the Trevi Fountain. When they arrive, Maria and Anita are disappointed to see the fountain emptied for cleaning. When they are joined by Frances, however, the water springs up again, and the women are thrilled by its beauty. Dino and Giorgio then arrive, and as the men embrace their girlfriends, Frances is joined by Shadwell, and they happily admire the fountain, which has proved lucky to them all.

Cast
 Clifton Webb as John Frederick Shadwell
 Dorothy McGuire as Miss Frances
 Jean Peters as Anita Hutchins
 Louis Jourdan as Prince Dino di Cessi
 Rossano Brazzi as Giorgio Bianchi
 Maggie McNamara as Maria Williams
 Howard St. John as Burgoyne
 Kathryn Givney as Mrs. Burgoyne
 Cathleen Nesbitt as Principessa

Reception

Critical response
Upon its theatrical release, the film received generally positive reviews, particularly for its color and CinemaScope widescreen cinematography of Italian filming locations. In his review in The New York Times, Bosley Crowther wrote, "Three Coins in the Fountain is quite clearly a film in which the locale comes first. However, the nonsense of its fable tumbles nicely within the picture frame." Crowther underscored the film's visual appeal to the audiences of his time.

Variety noted that the film "has warmth, humor, a rich dose of romance and almost incredible pictorial appeal."

On Rotten Tomatoes, the film holds an approval rating of 60% based on 10 reviews, with an average rating of 5.9 out of 10.

Awards and nominations

The film was recognized by the American Film Institute in these lists:
 2002: AFI's 100 Years...100 Passions – Nominated
 2004: AFI's 100 Years...100 Songs:
 "Three Coins in the Fountain" (song) – Nominated

Remakes
Three other films based on the same novel have been released. The first was the 1964 musical The Pleasure Seekers starring Ann-Margret, Carol Lynley and Pamela Tiffin, directed by Jean Negulesco. The second was a 1966 20th Century Fox pilot for an unsold television series, which was directed by Hal Kanter, written by Kanter and Melville Shavelson and starred Cynthia Pepper, Yvonne Craig and Joanna Moore. The television film was finally broadcast in 1970. Sergio Franchi sang the title song. The third was the 1990 television film Coins in the Fountain starring Loni Anderson.

Three Coins in the Fountain also inspired the 2010 film When in Rome, which tells the story of a woman who takes coins from a love fountain in Rome and finds unwanted love.

References

Bibliography

External links
 
 
 
 
 

1954 films
1954 comedy-drama films
1954 romantic comedy films
1954 romantic drama films
1950s English-language films
1950s romantic comedy-drama films
20th Century Fox films
American romantic comedy-drama films
CinemaScope films
Films based on American novels
Films directed by Jean Negulesco
Films produced by Sol C. Siegel
Films scored by Victor Young
Films set in Rome
Films shot in Rome
Films that won the Best Original Song Academy Award
Films whose cinematographer won the Best Cinematography Academy Award
1950s American films